Since the sport's inception, the design and manufacture of tennis equipment has been affected by technological advances and regulations. As is common in major sports, regulations became more exacting over time, with improvements affecting the qualities of the tennis racket and the tennis ball.

Rackets 

As materials improved, becoming lighter and stronger, rackets were made larger, accordingly. Larger rackets have more surface area, making them easier for many players to return a ball. Sizes are:

 Mid:  and below
 Mid-plus: 
 Oversized: 
 Super-oversized:  and larger

The balance point and grip size of a racket changed as technology progressed.  Depending on the player's style of play, choice is made between a head-heavy racket and a head-light racket. Head-heavy rackets provide more power on serves and ground strokes, while head-light rackets provide more control.  Along with racket balance, the size of the grip on the racket can affect play style as well.

Materials 

Early rackets were made of wood, which was not as good as modern materials, since wood has inconsistencies, resulting in different feels when striking the ball. Wood rackets needed a brace to stop warping when not in use. Later designs used metals, with experimenting with metals such as aluminum, magnesium and titanium.

In 1968, Spalding launched an aluminium racquet, called "The Smasher". Aluminium is lighter and more flexible than steel, but stiffer – and therefore less accurate – than wood. Because of this, most of the top players still preferred to use wooden frames – and a decade later they were still in use.

1980s graphite introduction
In the early 1980s, "graphite" (carbon fibre) composites were introduced, and other materials were added to the composite, including ceramics, glass-fibre, boron, and titanium. The Dunlop Max200G used by John McEnroe from 1983 was an early graphite racket, along with the very popular Prince original graphite. Composite rackets are the contemporary standard, the last wooden racquet appeared at Wimbledon in 1987. Later, people experimented with materials such as boron, ceramics, graphite, and composites. Each material had its own desirable qualities but ceramics and graphite were the best picks for being very stiff as well as being very good with vibration reduction.

Strings 

The earliest strings were made from cow intestines ("natural gut"), a reliable string but very expensive.  With time and improved technology manufacturers have been trying to duplicate the natural gut feel with synthetic materials.  Also, manufacturers are creating strings that are designed to produce more spin, power, and durability.  It remains unclear whether the technological innovations in materials, product architecture, and size affected the performance of players, even if such innovations are controversial and even contested by sport-regulatory bodies. The prevailing standards are as much due to advancements in musical string technology as to the social construction of the racket by the tennis playing public and the manufacturers who furnish the sporting goods. Social construction refers to the framing or interpretation of the physical implement by the community of tennis players some of whom often challenged the putative benefits of certain strings or other aspects of the tennis rackets.

Balls 

Originally the tennis ball consisted of rough cloth strips tightly bound together.  Eventually the cloth strips became the core, wrapped in twine and covered by a finer cloth or felt hand-stitched around it.  In 1972, at the request of Lamar Hunt to televise World Championship Tennis, the tennis ball was manufactured with the optic yellow felt.  Now yellow tennis balls are mass-produced for high performance at minimal costs.

See also 
 Tennis
 Tennis injuries
 Tennis statistics

References 

Technology